Raymond's Algorithm is a lock based algorithm for mutual exclusion on a distributed system.  It imposes a logical structure (a K-ary tree) on distributed resources.  As defined, each node has only a single parent, to which all requests to attain the token are made.

Algorithm

Nodal properties

 Each node has only one parent to whom received requests are forwarded
 Each node maintains a FIFO queue of requests each time that it sees the token;
 If any node is forwarding privilege to other node and has non-empty queue then it forwards a request message along

Algorithm

 If a node i (not holding the token) wishes to receive the token in order to enter into its critical section, it sends a request to its parent, node j.
 If node j FIFO is empty, node j shifts i into its FIFO queue; j then issues a request to its parent, k, that it desires the token
 If node j FIFO queue is not empty, it simply shifts i into the queue
 When node k has token and receives the request from j it sends token to j and sets j as its parent
 When node j receives the token from k, it forwards the token to i and i is removed from the queue of j
 If the queue of j is not empty after forwarding the token to i, j must issue a request to i in order to get the token back

Note: If j wishes to request a token, and its queue is not empty, then it places itself into its own queue.  Node j will utilize the token to enter into its critical section if it is at the head of the queue when the token is received.

Complexity 

Raymond's algorithm is guaranteed to be O(log n) per critical section entry if the processors are organized into a K-ary tree.  Additionally, each processor needs to store at most O(log n) bits because it must track O(1) neighbors.

References

See also 
 Ricart-Agrawala algorithm
 Lamport's bakery algorithm
 Lamport's distributed mutual exclusion algorithm
 Maekawa's algorithm
 Suzuki-Kasami's algorithm
 Naimi-Trehel's algorithm

Concurrency control algorithms